Havstein Island is a rocky island,  long and  wide, situated  north of Law Promontory and  east of Broka Island, in Antarctica. It was mapped by Norwegian cartographers from aerial photographs taken by the Lars Christensen Expedition, 1936–37, and named Havstein (sea stone), probably because of its rocky nature and its seaward position.

See also 
 List of Antarctic and sub-Antarctic islands

References

Islands of Kemp Land